EOC may refer to:

 Earth Observation Center
 Eastern Oregon College, now Eastern Oregon University, in La Grande, Oregon
 Eastern Orthodox Church
 Economy of Communion
 Elswick Ordnance Company, a defunct British armaments manufacturer
 Emergency operations center
 End of Course Test
 Equal Opportunities Commission (disambiguation)
 Ethernet over coax
 Ethernet over copper
 Ethics of care
 Ethnography of communication
 European Olympic Committees
 European Orienteering Championships
 Evangelical Orthodox Church